Valentina Medina, aka Iere (May 6, 1933 - April 23, 2011), born in Mount Pleasant, Arima, was the fifth Carib Queen since the introduction of the title in 1875.

On 26 March 2000, Valentina Medina, aged 66, of Mausica Lands, Arima, Trinidad, was named Carib Queen for life, at an election at the Santa Rosa Carib Community Centre in Arima. Medina, the fifth Queen, was named as the successor after Justa Werges, queen for the previous 11 years, died in January 2000. Medina was installed as Queen on May 6, 2000.

Though she embraced the Carib way of life since childhood, after her marriage at 18 in 1952 to John Medina, she was called on by then Queen (Edith Martinez) to be more active in traditional Carib life. She was named queen for a day three different times and her husband was named king for the day as well.

References

1933 births
2011 deaths
Carib Queens
People from Arima